Pedro Catalino Pedrucci Valerio (born September 30, 1961) is a Uruguayan former football player.

External links

1961 births
Living people
Uruguayan footballers
Uruguayan expatriate footballers
Uruguay international footballers
C.A. Progreso players
Club Nacional de Football players
Defensor Sporting players
Hokkaido Consadole Sapporo players
Peñarol players
Club Atlético River Plate (Montevideo) players
Liverpool F.C. (Montevideo) players
S.D. Quito footballers
Expatriate footballers in France
Expatriate footballers in Japan
Japan Soccer League players
Uruguayan people of Italian descent

Association football midfielders